"Burn" is a song recorded by American industrial rock band Nine Inch Nails for the soundtrack to the 1994 film Natural Born Killers. It was released as a promotional single from the soundtrack. The song was included as a bonus track on the 10th anniversary deluxe edition of The Downward Spiral in 2004. Live performances of the song are featured on KROQ Christmas 2005 and the concert film Beside You in Time.

Music video

The music video was co-directed by Hank Corwin and Trent Reznor. The video features Reznor performing in front of a projection screen displaying a montage of stock footage and footage from the Natural Born Killers film. The stock footage and rear-projection techniques used in the video are similar to the ones employed in much of the film.

Csaba Toth contributed a detailed reading of the video in his article "Like Cancer in the System: Industrial Gothic, Nine Inch Nails, and Videotape":

References

1994 songs
Nine Inch Nails songs
Song recordings produced by Trent Reznor
Songs written for films
Songs written by Trent Reznor
Industrial metal songs
Speed metal songs